Bala Hissar, Bala Hisar or Balahisar may refer to:
 Bala Hissar, Kabul, a fortress in Kabul, Afghanistan
 Bala Hissar, Peshawar, a fortress in Peshawar, Pakistan
Bala Hissar, Mussoorie, a place in Mussoorie, India 
 Bala Hisar, Iran, a village in Iran
 Balahesar, a village in Samangan Province, Afghanistan